Events in the year 1913 in Germany.

Incumbents

National level
 Kaiser – Wilhelm II
 Chancellor – Theobald von Bethmann Hollweg

State level

Kingdoms
 King of Bavaria – Otto of Bavaria to 5 November, then Ludwig III of Bavaria
 King of Prussia – Kaiser Wilhelm II
 King of Saxony – Frederick Augustus III of Saxony
 King of Württemberg – William II of Württemberg

Grand Duchies
 Grand Duke of Baden – Frederick II
 Grand Duke of Hesse – Ernest Louis
 Grand Duke of Mecklenburg-Schwerin – Frederick Francis IV
 Grand Duke of Mecklenburg-Strelitz – Adolphus Frederick V
 Grand Duke of Oldenburg – Frederick Augustus II
 Grand Duke of Saxe-Weimar-Eisenach – William Ernest

Principalities
 Schaumburg-Lippe – Adolf II, Prince of Schaumburg-Lippe
 Schwarzburg-Rudolstadt – Günther Victor, Prince of Schwarzburg
 Schwarzburg-Sondershausen – Günther Victor, Prince of Schwarzburg
 Principality of Lippe – Leopold IV, Prince of Lippe
 Reuss Elder Line – Heinrich XXIV, Prince Reuss of Greiz (with Heinrich XIV, Prince Reuss Younger Line to 29 March, then Heinrich XXVII, Prince Reuss Younger Line, as regent)
 Reuss Younger Line – Heinrich XIV, Prince Reuss Younger Line to 29 March, then Heinrich XXVII, Prince Reuss Younger Line
 Waldeck and Pyrmont – Friedrich, Prince of Waldeck and Pyrmont

Duchies
 Duke of Anhalt – Frederick II, Duke of Anhalt
 Duke of Brunswick – Duke John Albert of Mecklenburg (regent) to 1 November, then Ernest Augustus, Duke of Brunswick from 2 November
 Duke of Saxe-Altenburg – Ernst II, Duke of Saxe-Altenburg
 Duke of Saxe-Coburg and Gotha – Charles Edward, Duke of Saxe-Coburg and Gotha
 Duke of Saxe-Meiningen – Georg II, Duke of Saxe-Meiningen

Colonial Governors
 Cameroon (Kamerun) – Karl Ebermaier (1st term) to 9 October, then ... Full
 Kiaochow (Kiautschou) – Alfred Meyer-Waldeck
 German East Africa (Deutsch-Ostafrika) – Albert Heinrich Schnee
 German New Guinea (Deutsch-Neuguinea) – Albert Hahl (2nd term)
 German Samoa (Deutsch-Samoa) – Erich Schultz-Ewerth
 German South-West Africa (Deutsch-Südwestafrika) – Theodor Seitz
 Togoland – Duke Adolf Friedrich of Mecklenburg

Events

 April 10 – Albrecht Grocery Shop, predecessor of the Aldi discount store chain globally, is founded in Essen.
 May 16 – Eberswalde Hoard discovered
 June 20 – Bremen school shooting causes the death of five pupils and the wounding 21 other people.
 September 9 – In Oppau, BASF starts the world's first plant for the production of fertilizer based on the Haber-Bosch process, feeding today about a third of the world's population.
 October 17 – Johannisthal air disaster occurs with an Imperial German Navy's L 2 airship's test flight resulted in the death of all 28 passengers and crew on board
 Date unknown - Bergius process is invented by German chemist Friedrich Bergius.	
 Date unknown - Chemical element Protactinium is first identified by Oswald Helmuth Göhring and Kasimir Fajans.
 Date unknown -  Die Naturwissenschaften first published by Die Kaiser-Wilhelm-Gesellschaft zur Förderung der Wissenschaften e. V.

Births

	
 23 January - Herbert Runge, German boxer (died 1986)
 29 January - Peter von Zahn, German journalist, writer (died 2001)
 25 February — Gert Fröbe, German actor (died 1988)
 26 February – Hermann Lenz, German poet and author (died 1998)
 2 March - Falk Harnack, German director and screenwriter (died 1991)
 18 March - Reinhard Hardegen, German U-boat commander (died 2018)
 21 March - Werner Höfer, German journalist (died 1997)
 9 April - Heinrich Wöhlk German optometrist. (died 1991)	
 10 April - Stefan Heym, German writer (died 2001)
 19 April - Karl Rawer, German physicist, specialist in radio wave propagation and the ionosphere (died 2018)
 21 April - Kai-Uwe von Hassel, German politician (died 1997)
 24 April - Paul Esser, German actor (died 1988)
 27 April – Luz Long, German long jump athlete (died 1943)
 13 May - Lotte Rausch, German actress (died 1995)	
 26 May - Josef Manger, German heavy weightlifter (died 1991)
 31 May – Peter Frankenfeld, German comedian (died 1979)
 2 June - Walter Andreas Schwarz, German singer, song-writer (died 1992)
 10 June – Benjamin Shapira, German-born Israeli biochemist (died 1993)	
 26 June – Rudolf Brazda, German concentration camp prisoner (died 2011)
 1 August - Heinz Ellenberg, German biologist (died 1997)
 1 August - Hajo Herrmann, German Luftwaffe pilot (died 2010)
 4 August – Johann Niemann, SS officer (died 1943)
 10 August – Wolfgang Paul, German physicist (died 1993)	
 26 August - Julius Döpfner, German cardinal of Roman Catholic Church (died 1976)
 15 September - Johannes Steinhoff, German general (died 1994)
 15 September - Hans Filbinger, German politician (died 2007)
 26 September - Berthold Beitz, German industrialist (died 2013)
 26 September - Ernst Schnabel, German writer (died 1986)
 24 October - Jürgen Oesten, German seaman, U-boat commander during World War II. (died 2010)
 8 November – Ludwig Elsbett, German engineer (died 2003)
 13 November - Walter Horten, German aircraft pilot (died 1998)
 21 November - Volker von Collande, German actor and film director (died 1990)
 24 November - Gisela Mauermayer, German athlete (died 1995)
 9 December - Friedrich Dickel, German politician (died 1993)
 9 December - Fritz Grasshoff, German writer (died 1997)
 18 December – Willy Brandt, German politician, former Chancellor of Germany (died 1992)
 19 December - Ernst Stuhlinger, German rocket scientist (died 2008)
 25 December – Henri Nannen, German journalist (died 1996)
 28 December - Egbert Hayessen, German mayor (died 1944)
 30 December - Tilo von Berlepsch, German actor (died 1991)

Deaths

 4 January - Alfred von Schlieffen, German fieldmarshall (born 1833)
 6 January -  Carl Arp, landscape painter (born 1867)
 8 January - Friedrich Schrempf, German editor and politician (born 1858)
 11 January - Karl Binz, German pharmacologist (born 1832)
 21 January - Friedrich von Hollmann, German admiral (born 1842)
 6 March – Paul Friedrich August Ascherson, botanist (born 1834)
 29 March – Heinrich XIV, Prince Reuss Younger Line, nobleman (born 1832)
 14 April - Carl Hagenbeck, German merchant (born 1844)
 19 April – Hugo Winckler, archaeologist (born 1863)
 29 April - Andreas Flocken, German engineer and inventor (born 1845)
 29 May – Eduard Pechuël-Loesche, naturalist, geographer, ethnologist, painter, traveler, author and plant collector (born 1840)
 9 August – Wilhelm Albermann, German sculptor (born 1835)
 13 August
 Bernhard Bardenheuer, surgeon (born 1839)
 August Bebel, politician (born 1840)
 21 August –  Carl Ludwig von Bar, jurist (born 1836)
 29 August – Herman Aron, electrical engineer (born 1845)
 31 August – Erwin Bälz, physician and anthroplogist (born 1849)
 29 September – Rudolf Diesel, engineer and inventor (born 1858)
 5 October - Hans von Bartels, painter (born 1856)
 10 October - Adolphus Busch, German businessman (born 1839)
 7 December - Heinrich Ernst Göring, German jurist and diplomat (born 1839)
 8 December - Johann von Berenberg-Gossler, banker (born 1839)
 22 December – Theodor Kaes, neurologist (born 1852)

References

 
Years of the 20th century in Germany
Germany
Germany